J. Anthony Jordan (born September 9, 1964) is an American politician and former Republican member of the New York State Assembly, representing the 113th Assembly District from 2009-2013. He is the District Attorney of Washington County, New York.

Jordan received a bachelor's degree in business with a concentration in finance from the University of Notre Dame in 1986. He earned a J.D. degree (magna cum laude) from the University of Pennsylvania Law School in 1995. He was a partner in the law firm of Jordan & Kelly LLC. Prior to being elected, he served part-time as Assistant District Attorney in Washington County.

In 2008, he was elected to replace Assemblyman Roy McDonald, who was running for the New York State Senate. Jordan won his November 2008 general election with 57 percent of the vote and ran uncontested in the November 2010 general election.

In April 2013, Jordan announced he would run for Washington County District Attorney. On November 5, 2013, Jordan ran on the Republican, Conservative, and Independent Party lines defeating incumbent District Attorney Kevin Kortright who ran on the Democratic line.

Jordan resides near Greenwich, New York. He and his wife Wendy Jordan (née Skellie) have four children.

References

External links
New York State Assembly website
 

1964 births
Living people
Republican Party members of the New York State Assembly
University of Notre Dame alumni
University of Pennsylvania Law School alumni
21st-century American politicians